Nilo Murtinho Braga, best known as Nilo (April 3, 1903 – February 7, 1975) was an association footballer in forward striker role. He was born in Rio de Janeiro, Brazil.

During his career (1918–1937) he played for América-RN, Fluminense and Botafogo. He won six Rio de Janeiro State Tournament, four consecutives (1924, 1930, 1932, 1933, 1934, 1935) and for three time winning top goalscorer in 1924, 1927 and 1933. For Brazilian team he participated in the 1930 FIFA World Cup, played one match with Yugoslavia.

He died at 71 years old.

Honours

Club
 Campeonato Carioca (6): 
Fluminense: 1924
Botafogo: 1930, 1932, 1933, 1934, 1935
 Campeonato Potiguar (1): 
América de Natal: 1919

National
 Copa Rio Branco (1):
Brazil: 1931

Individual
 Campeonato Carioca topscorer (3): 
 1924, 1927, 1933

References

1903 births
1930 FIFA World Cup players
1975 deaths
Footballers from Rio de Janeiro (city)
Brazilian footballers
Brazil international footballers
Association football forwards
América Futebol Clube (RN) players
Botafogo de Futebol e Regatas players
Fluminense FC players